Loxostege diaphana is a moth in the family Crambidae. It was described by Aristide Caradja and Edward Meyrick in 1934. It is found in Guangdong, China.

References

Moths described in 1934
Pyraustinae